Bence Mervó (born 5 March 1995) is a Hungarian football player who plays for Szentlőrinc.

Club career
On 31 May 2014 Mervó made his first appearance in Győr on the 30th match day of the 2013–14 Nemzeti Bajnokság I season against Mezőkövesd at ETO Park, Győr, Hungary.

In the 2014–15 Nemzeti Bajnokság I season he made five more appearances in Győri ETO FC.

Sion
In 2015 Mervó was signed by Swiss Super League club Sion. He has not made any appearances in the 2015–16 Swiss Super League season.

Śląsk Wrocław (loan)
On 29 February 2016 he was loaned to Polish Ekstraklasa club Śląsk Wrocław.

On 9 April 2016 he scored his first goal in the 70th minute against Cracovia Krakow on the 30th match day of the 2015–16 Ekstraklasa season at the Stadion Miejski, Wrocław, Poland. The match ended with a 2-1 victory for Śląsk Wrocław.

On 20 April 2016 he managed to score a double against Jagiellonia Białystok on the 2nd match day of the 2015–16 Ekstraklasa play-off. He scored in the 14th and 35th minutes and the match ended with a 3-1 victory for Śląsk Wrocław.

Szentlőrinc
After playing for Szentlőrinc on loan in the previous two seasons, on 18 July 2022 Mervó moved to the club on a permanent basis with a two-year contract.

International career
He was part of the Hungarian U-19 at the 2014 UEFA European Under-19 Championship and  U-20 team at the 2015 FIFA U-20 World Cup.

Hungary U-21
On 1 September 2016 he scored a double against Liechtenstein in the 2017 UEFA European Under-21 Championship qualification at Ménfői út.

Club statistics

Updated to games played as of 23 December 2020.

References

External links
MLSZ 

1995 births
People from Mosonmagyaróvár
Sportspeople from Győr-Moson-Sopron County
Living people
Hungarian footballers
Hungary youth international footballers
Hungary under-21 international footballers
Association football midfielders
Győri ETO FC players
FC Sion players
Śląsk Wrocław players
FC DAC 1904 Dunajská Streda players
Budafoki LC footballers
Szentlőrinci SE footballers
Nemzeti Bajnokság I players
Ekstraklasa players
Slovak Super Liga players
Nemzeti Bajnokság II players
Hungarian expatriate footballers
Expatriate footballers in Switzerland
Hungarian expatriate sportspeople in Switzerland
Expatriate footballers in Poland
Hungarian expatriate sportspeople in Poland
Expatriate footballers in Slovakia
Hungarian expatriate sportspeople in Slovakia